Ecchinswell, Sydmonton and Bishops Green (occasionally referred to as just Ecchinswell and Sydmonton) is a civil parish within the district of Basingstoke and Deane in Hampshire, United Kingdom.

Sydmonton is the home of Sydmonton Court, estate of the Kingsmill Family, including Admiral Sir Robert Kingsmill.  The estate is currently owned by Andrew Lloyd Webber and is home to the annual Sydmonton Festival.

Geography
Watership Down, location of the famous Richard Adams novel of the same name, is just South of Ecchinswell. Ladle Hill on Great Litchfield Down, also lies to the south.  Part of the hill is a  biological SSSI, first notified in 1978. The hill has a partially completed Iron Age hill fort on its summit, and the surrounding area is rich in Iron Age tumuli, enclosures, lynchets and field systems. Ladle Hill and Watership Down are easily accessed from the Wayfarer's Walk cross-county footpath that passes through the parish.

See also
Ecchinswell
Sydmonton
Sydmonton Festival
Bishop's Green

References

Civil parishes in Basingstoke and Deane